Veerakeralam is within the corporation limits of Coimbatore city in the Indian state of Tamil Nadu. It lies on extreme part of westside of the city.

Demographics
 India census, Veerakeralam had a population of 19,993. Males constitute 51% of the population and females 49%. Veerakeralam has an average literacy rate of 77%, higher than the national average of 59.5%: male literacy is 82%, and female literacy is 72%. In Veerakeralam, 9% of the population is under 6 years of age.

References

Neighbourhoods in Coimbatore